The Davis Motorcar Company was an American automobile manufacturer based in Van Nuys, in the San Fernando Valley region of Los Angeles, California, which produced three-wheeled automobiles from 1947 to 1948. In total the company produced 13 vehicles.

History

Founder Glenn Gordon "Gary" Davis (d. 1973) acquired a prototype called "The Californian" from designer Frank Kurtis, who built it for millionaire racecar driver Joel Thorne.
 
Davis operated in a 57,000 sq. ft. former aircraft assembly building in Van Nuys, where a prototype three-wheeler named "Baby" was built. Baby was powered by a 47 hp Hercules 4-cylinder engine coupled to a Borg-Warner 3-speed transmission and Spicer rear end. Baby was unique in that it featured four-across seating. It was planned that production, beginning in 1948, would start at a minimum of 50 cars a day later increasing to 1,000. A second prototype called "Delta" was built, and a third prototype, the model 482, was completed later. The third model, the "Divan", established standards for the production Davis cars.
.
The company closed down in 1948, as workers and engineers were not being paid, and lawsuits were threatened by investors and dealers. Former employees then filed suit for back pay, and the company was investigated on allegations of fraud. Soon after the Davis plant was shut down, Gary Davis was convicted on 20 of 28 counts of theft (he was acquitted on four counts of theft and four of fraud) and was sentenced to 8 months to two years in jail.

Davis developed a variant for military use. The Model 494 was a Jeep-like version of the Divan with an open body. Arrangements were ongoing with the Pentagon to run tests at the Aberdeen Proving Grounds in Maryland. Ultimately three 494s were built in less than a week, two of which were shipped to the Army for testing.

The assets of Davis were sold for back taxes in May 1950. The remainder of the company now belongs to Wayne Miller who resides in Arizona.

Delta Motor Car Company
Sixteen out of 300 franchise holders formed Delta Motor Car Company in an effort to salvage the car and their investments. Delta tried to have Reliant Engineering Company in Staffordshire, England, manufacture the car in 1953, but investor funds ran out and the enterprise folded.

References

Bibliography
David Burgess Wise, The New Illustrated Encyclopedia of Automobiles 
Michael Lamm, Special-Interest Autos magazine, Vol.1, No. 1, Sept.-Oct. 1970

External links
 Davis Registry

Defunct motor vehicle manufacturers of the United States
Motor vehicle manufacturers based in California
Three-wheeled motor vehicles
Automotive companies established in 1947
1947 establishments in California